St John Ambulance Australia employs the use of ranks, as an organisation with its roots in the military. Its rank structure is based upon that of St John Ambulance in the United Kingdom, while also taking inspiration from the Australian Army.

Rank tables

Formal Uniform 
Doctors, Paramedics, Registered and Enrolled Nurses have special markings on the epaulette to indicate their Health Care Professional status.

Events Uniform (New South Wales) 
Clinical Epaulettes are worn for members involved in events or activities requiring the Events
Uniform.
The below Clinical Epaulettes are only in use within St. John Ambulance Australia (New South Wales)

References

See also 
St John Ambulance Australia
Insignia of the Venerable Order of St John
St John Ambulance Australia (NSW) Ranks and Insignia

St John Ambulance
Non-military rank insignia